Asswiller is a commune in the Bas-Rhin department in the Grand Est region of north-eastern France.

The inhabitants of the commune are known as Asswillerois or Asswilleroises.

The commune has been awarded one flower by the National Council of Towns and Villages in Bloom in the Competition of cities and villages in Bloom.

Geography
Asswiller is in the Northern Vosges Regional Natural Park some 27 km south-east of Sarralbe and 38 km south-west of Bitche. Access to the commune is by the D9 road from Durstel in the north-west passing through the heart of the commune and the village and continuing south-east to Petersbach. The D309 road goes south-west from the village to Drulingen. There is a large forest in the west with strips of forest along the borders with the remainder of the commune farmland.

The  forms the south-western boundary of the commune as it flows west to eventually join the Sarre west of Wolfskirchen. The Ottwillergraben forms the eastern border of the commune as it flows north to join the Eichel at Tieffenbach.

Neighbouring communes and villages

Toponymy
 718: Asco vilare
1793: Asveiller
1801: Asswiler

In German the commune name is Aßweiler.

History
Asswiller was a small lordship dependent on the Counts of La Petite-Pierre. When the count palatine of Bavaria, Georg Johann I of Bavaria, took possession of the county, he granted Asswiller as a hereditary fief to the Dalheim family (1588), who were soon succeeded by the Steinkallenfels family: senior officials of the palatine counts. These Protestant lords introduced the Reformation and remained in Asswiller from the 16th century to 1819. In 1789 Asswiller belonged to the Lord of Carbiston who had acquired it in 1771 by marriage with the heiress of the Steincallenfels family.

After the French Revolution Asswiller was attached to France in 1793 by decree of the National Convention which overrode the rights of princes holding possessions.

Heraldry

Administration

List of Successive Mayors

Demography
In 2017 the commune had 276 inhabitants.

Culture and heritage

Civil heritage
Many buildings and structures in Asswiller are registered as historical monuments:
A Farmhouse at 2 Rue du Cimetière (1775)
A Chateau at 6 Rue de Drulingen (13th century)
The Town Hall/School at 10 Rue de Durstel (19th century)
A Farmhouse at 18 Rue de Durstel (20th century)
A Courthouse at 2 Rue de Durstel (1733)
A Farmhouse at 26 Rue de Durstel (1861)
A Farmhouse at  5 Rue de Durstel (19th century)
A Farmhouse at 5 Bis Rue de Durstel (1761)
A Farmhouse at 14 Rue de Petersbach (1803)
A Farmhouse at  8 Rue de Petersbach (18th century)
A Mill called Jaegermuhle (1833)

Religious heritage
Several religious buildings and structures are registered as historical monuments:
A Cemetery at Rue du Cimetière (19th century)
A Protestant Church at Rue de Durstel (1776)
A Protestant Presbytery at 4 Rue de Durstel (18th century)
A Lutheran Church at Rue de l'Eglise (1724)

The Cemetery contains two items that are registered as historical objects:
The Rauscher family tomb (1924)
3 Sculptures

The Lutheran Church contains two items that are registered as historical objects:
The Furniture in the church
The Organ (1864)

Gallery of Historical Monuments

See also
Communes of the Bas-Rhin department

References

External links
Asswiller on the old IGN website 
Asweiller on the 1750 Cassini Map

Communes of Bas-Rhin